The 2022 New England Revolution season is the club's 27th season of existence, and their 27th consecutive season playing in Major League Soccer, the top flight of American soccer. The season began on February 15 when the club began their play in the 2022 CONCACAF Champions League, while the MLS season began on February 26, where the Revolution entered as the defender Supporters' Shield winners. Outside of these two competitions, the Revolution will play in the 2022 U.S. Open Cup.

Background 

The 2021 season was the Revolution's 26th season of existence, and their 26th season in MLS, the top tier of American soccer. Due to the ongoing COVID-19 pandemic, the Revolution began the season on April 17, and the season concluded on November 7. The Revolution were slated to play in the 2022 U.S. Open Cup in addition to MLS play, but the tournament was cancelled by U.S. Soccer due to logistical challenges associated with the pandemic.

During the club regular season, the Revolution amassed a total of 73 points, off of a record of 22–5–7, which set the record for the most points obtained in the regular season. At the end of the regular season, manager Bruce Arena won the Sigi Schmid Coach of the Year Award, for the best coach of the 2021 season. Goalkeeper Matt Turner won the MLS Goalkeeper of the Year Award, and Carles Gil won the MLS Comeback Player of the Year Award. Four players from the Revolution were named to the MLS Best XI for the 2021 season, which was tied for the second most in league history. Turner, Gil, Tajon Buchanan, and Gustavo Bou were named to the Best XI.

Outside of MLS play, the club qualified for the 2021 MLS Cup Playoffs. In the Conference Semifinals (or Quarterfinals), the Revolution lost to eventual MLS Cup finalist, New York City FC on penalties, ending their hopes to be the first MLS team to complete the league double (winning both the Supporters' Shield and MLS Cup) since 2017.

Club

Team management

Roster 

Appearances and goals are career totals from all-competitions.

Non-competitive

Preseason exhibitions

Midseason exhibitions 
None

Competitive

Major League Soccer

Results

U.S. Open Cup

CONCACAF Champions League

Round of 16

Quarterfinals

Transfers

Transfers in

Transfers out

MLS SuperDraft picks

Statistics

Appearances and goals

Top scorers 
{| class="wikitable" style="font-size: 100%; text-align: center;"
|-
! style="background:#0C2340; color:#FFFFFF; border:2px solid #C8102E; width:35px;" scope="col"|Rank
! style="background:#0C2340; color:#FFFFFF; border:2px solid #C8102E; width:35px;" scope="col"|Position
! style="background:#0C2340; color:#FFFFFF; border:2px solid #C8102E; width:35px;" scope="col"|No.
! style="background:#0C2340; color:#FFFFFF; border:2px solid #C8102E; width:140px;" scope="col"|Name
! style="background:#0C2340; color:#FFFFFF; border:2px solid #C8102E; width:75px;" scope="col"|
! style="background:#0C2340; color:#FFFFFF; border:2px solid #C8102E; width:75px;" scope="col"|
! style="background:#0C2340; color:#FFFFFF; border:2px solid #C8102E; width:75px;" scope="col"|
! style="background:#0C2340; color:#FFFFFF; border:2px solid #C8102E; width:75px;" scope="col"|CCL
! style="background:#0C2340; color:#FFFFFF; border:2px solid #C8102E; width:75px;" scope="col"|Total
|-
|1||FW||9|| Adam Buksa||7 ||2 ||0 ||2 ||11
|-
|2||MF||22|| Carles Gil||7 ||3 ||0 ||0 ||10
|-
|3||FW||7|| Gustavo Bou||8 ||0 ||0 ||0 ||8
|-
|4||MF||26|| Tommy McNamara||4 ||0 ||0 ||0 ||4
|-
|rowspan=2 |5||MF||27|| Dylan Borrero||3 ||0 ||0 ||0 ||3
|-
|MF||17|| Sebastian Lletget||2 ||0 ||0 ||1 ||3
|-
|rowspan=4 |7||DF||15|| Brandon Bye||2 ||0 ||0 ||0 ||2
|-
|MF||11|| Emmanuel Boateng||2 ||0 ||0 ||0 ||2
|-
|MF||8|| Matt Polster||2 ||0 ||0 ||0 ||2
|-
|FW||12|| Justin Rennicks||2 ||0 ||0 ||0 ||2
|-
|rowspan=8 |11||FW||14|| Jozy Altidore||1 ||0 ||0 ||0 ||1
|-
|MF||72|| Damian Rivera||1 ||0 ||0 ||0 ||1
|-
|DF||24|| DeJuan Jones||1 ||0 ||0 ||0 ||1
|-
|MF||5|| Wilfrid Kaptoum||1 ||0 ||0 ||0 ||1
|-
|DF||4|| Henry Kessler||1 ||0 ||0 ||0 ||1
|-
|DF||23|| Jonathan Bell||1 ||0 ||0 ||0 ||1
|-
|FW||29|| Noel Buck||1 ||0 ||0 ||0 ||1
|-
|FW||9|| Giacomo Vrioni||1 ||0 ||0 ||0 ||1
|-
!colspan="4"|Total
!47!!5!!0!!3!!55

Top assists 
{| class="wikitable" style="font-size: 100%; text-align: center;"
|-
! style="background:#0C2340; color:#FFFFFF; border:2px solid #C8102E; width:35px;" scope="col"|Rank
! style="background:#0C2340; color:#FFFFFF; border:2px solid #C8102E; width:35px;" scope="col"|Position
! style="background:#0C2340; color:#FFFFFF; border:2px solid #C8102E; width:35px;" scope="col"|No.
! style="background:#0C2340; color:#FFFFFF; border:2px solid #C8102E; width:140px;" scope="col"|Name
! style="background:#0C2340; color:#FFFFFF; border:2px solid #C8102E; width:75px;" scope="col"|
! style="background:#0C2340; color:#FFFFFF; border:2px solid #C8102E; width:75px;" scope="col"|
! style="background:#0C2340; color:#FFFFFF; border:2px solid #C8102E; width:75px;" scope="col"|
! style="background:#0C2340; color:#FFFFFF; border:2px solid #C8102E; width:75px;" scope="col"|Total
|-
|1||MF||22|| Carles Gil||14 ||1 ||0 ||15
|-
|2||DF||15|| Brandon Bye||7 ||2 ||0 ||9
|-
|3||DF||24|| DeJuan Jones||7 ||0 ||0 ||7
|-
|4||MF||26|| Tommy McNamara||5 ||1 ||0 ||6
|-
|5||MF||17|| Sebastian Lletget||5 ||0 ||0 ||5
|-
|6||MF||11|| Emmanuel Boateng||3 ||0 ||0 ||3
|-
|rowspan=5 |7||FW||9|| Adam Buksa||2 ||0 ||0 ||2
|-
|MF||8|| Matt Polster||2 ||0 ||0 ||2
|-
|DF||2|| Andrew Farrell||2 ||0 ||0 ||2
|-
|MF||27|| Dylan Borrero||2 ||0 ||0 ||2
|-
|FW||7|| Gustavo Bou||2 ||0 ||0 ||2
|-
|rowspan=3 |12||MF||25|| Arnór Ingvi Traustason||1 ||0 ||0 ||1
|-
|MF||5|| Wilfrid Kaptoum||1 ||0 ||0 ||1
|-
|MF||13|| Maciel||1 ||0 ||0 ||1
|-
!colspan="4"|Total
!54!!4!!0!!58

Disciplinary record 
{| class="wikitable" style="font-size: 100%; text-align:center;"
|-
| rowspan="2" !width=15|
| rowspan="2" !width=15|
| rowspan="2" !width=120|Player
| colspan="3"|MLS
| colspan="3"|U.S. Open Cup
| colspan="3"|MLS Cup
| colspan="3"|Total
|-
!width=34; background:#fe9;|
!width=34; background:#fe9;|
!width=34; background:#ff8888;|
!width=34; background:#fe9;|
!width=34; background:#fe9;|
!width=34; background:#ff8888;|
!width=34; background:#fe9;|
!width=34; background:#fe9;|
!width=34; background:#ff8888;|
!width=34; background:#fe9;|
!width=34; background:#fe9;|
!width=34; background:#ff8888;|
|-
|26||MF|| Tommy McNamara||8 ||0 ||0 ||0 ||0 ||0 ||0 ||0 ||0 ||8 ||0 ||0
|-
|8||MF|| Matt Polster||6 ||0 ||0 ||0 ||0 ||0 ||0 ||0 ||0 ||6 ||0 ||0
|-
|4||DF|| Henry Kessler||5 ||0 ||0 ||1 ||0 ||0 ||0 ||0 ||0 ||6 ||0 ||0
|-
|2||DF|| Andrew Farrell||5 ||0 ||1 ||0 ||0 ||0 ||0 ||0 ||0 ||5 ||0 ||1
|-
|24||DF|| DeJuan Jones||4 ||0 ||0 ||0 ||0 ||0 ||0 ||0 ||0 ||4 ||0 ||0
|-
|7||FW|| Gustavo Bou||4 ||0 ||0 ||0 ||0 ||0 ||0 ||0 ||0 ||4 ||0 ||0
|-
|15||DF|| Brandon Bye||4 ||0 ||0 ||0 ||0 ||0 ||0 ||0 ||0 ||4 ||0 ||0
|-
|5||MF|| Wilfrid Kaptoum||3 ||0 ||0 ||0 ||0 ||0 ||0 ||0 ||0 ||3 ||0 ||0
|-
|10||MF|| Carles Gil||3 ||0 ||0 ||0 ||0 ||0 ||0 ||0 ||0 ||3 ||0 ||0
|-
|9||FW|| Adam Buksa||2 ||1 ||0 ||0 ||0 ||0 ||0 ||0 ||0 ||2 ||1 ||0
|-
|3||DF|| Omar Gonzalez||2 ||0 ||0 ||0 ||0 ||0 ||0 ||0 ||0 ||2 ||0 ||0
|-
|6||DF|| Christian Makoun||2 ||0 ||0 ||0 ||0 ||0 ||0 ||0 ||0 ||2 ||0 ||0
|-
|14||FW|| Jozy Altidore||1 ||0 ||0 ||0 ||0 ||0 ||0 ||0 ||0 ||1 ||0 ||0
|-
|11||MF|| Emmanuel Boateng||1 ||0 ||0 ||0 ||0 ||0 ||0 ||0 ||0 ||1 ||0 ||0
|-
|27||MF|| Dylan Borrero||1 ||0 ||0 ||0 ||0 ||0 ||0 ||0 ||0 ||1 ||0 ||0
|-
|17||MF|| Sebastian Lletget||1 ||0 ||0 ||0 ||0 ||0 ||0 ||0 ||0 ||1 ||0 ||0
|-
|72||MF|| Damian Rivera||1 ||0 ||0 ||0 ||0 ||0 ||0 ||0 ||0 ||1 ||0 ||0
|-
|25||MF|| Arnór Ingvi Traustason||1||0 ||0 ||0 ||0 ||0 ||0 ||0 ||0 ||1 ||0 ||0
|-
|29||MF|| Noel Buck||1||0 ||0 ||0 ||0 ||0 ||0 ||0 ||0 ||1 ||0 ||0
|-
|9||FW|| Giacomo Vrioni||1||0 ||0 ||0 ||0 ||0 ||0 ||0 ||0 ||1 ||0 ||0
|-
|31||MF|| Nacho Gil||1||0 ||0 ||0 ||0 ||0 ||0 ||0 ||0 ||1 ||0 ||0
|-
!colspan=3|Total !!57!!1!!1!!1!!0!!0!!0!!0!!0!!58!!1!!1

Clean sheets
{| class="wikitable sortable" style="text-align: center;"
|-
! style="background:#0C2340; color:#FFFFFF; border:2px solid #C8102E; width:35px;" scope="col"|No.
! style="background:#0C2340; color:#FFFFFF; border:2px solid #C8102E; width:160px;" scope="col"|Name
! style="background:#0C2340; color:#FFFFFF; border:2px solid #C8102E; width:50px;" scope="col"|
! style="background:#0C2340; color:#FFFFFF; border:2px solid #C8102E; width:50px;" scope="col"|
! style="background:#0C2340; color:#FFFFFF; border:2px solid #C8102E; width:50px;" scope="col"|
! style="background:#0C2340; color:#FFFFFF; border:2px solid #C8102E; width:50px;" scope="col"|CCL
! style="background:#0C2340; color:#FFFFFF; border:2px solid #C8102E; width:50px;" scope="col"|Total
! style="background:#0C2340; color:#FFFFFF; border:2px solid #C8102E; width:50px;" scope="col"|Games
|-
|99|| Djordje Petrovic||7 ||0 ||0 ||0 ||7 ||23
|-
|36|| Earl Edwards Jr.||1 ||0 ||0 ||1 ||2 ||6
|-
|30|| Matt Turner||1 ||0 ||0 ||0 ||1 ||5
|-
|18|| Brad Knighton||0 ||0 ||0 ||0 ||0 ||4

See also 
 2022 New England Revolution II season

References

External links 
 New England Revolution

New England Revolution seasons
New England Revolution
New England Revolution
2022 in sports in Massachusetts
Sports competitions in Foxborough, Massachusetts
New England